Uzunköprüspor is a Turkish sports club from Uzunköprü near Edirne in Turkey. The clubs plays in yellow and green kits, and have done so since their formation in 1970. In 2013–2014 season, Uzunköprüspor participated in Amatör Futbol Ligleri.

Stadium
Currently the team plays at the 800 capacity Uzunköprü Ergene Stadyumu.

Honours
TFF Third League:1987–1988

League participations
TFF Second League: 1988–1989
TFF Third League: 1989–?
Turkish Regional Amateur League: ?

References

External links
Tff

Stadium

Football clubs in Turkey
1970 establishments in Turkey